Acacia glaucocarpa, commonly known as the hickory wattle and the feathery wattle, is a species of Acacia native to eastern Australia.

It faintly ridged terete branchlets.

It is known to occur within protected areas and is found in many localities. It grows on sandstone or sedimentary rocks, often in deep soil.

The current population is not known but is stable with at least 40 mature individuals in one stand of Queensland plants and seeds stored as a conservation measure.

It is also used as a low maintenance ornamental plant with attractive foliage and a mass of flowers in autumn. It grows well inland and is frost and greywater tolerant.

See also
 List of Acacia species

References

glaucocarpa
Fabales of Australia
Flora of Queensland